Mir Saeid Marouf Lakerani (born 20 October 1985) is an Iranian volleyball setter. He was the captain of the Iranian national team. He was named best setter at the 2014 World League and 2008, 2012 and 2016 Olympic qualifying tournaments, as well as most valuable player at the 2013 Asian Championship. He participated in the Rio 2016 and Tokyo 2020 Olympics. He was voted Iranian Sportsmen of the year for (2015–16) of the Iranian calendar by an Iranian

Career

National team
Marouf's first national game was for Iran boys national volleyball team in 2001 and 4 years later, he joined the Iran men's national volleyball team. In 2007, Marouf became a constant member of men's national team but due to conflicts and disagreements, Marouf decided not to continue playing for men's national team in 2011 but he ultimately returned to team in 2012 and since former captain Alireza Nadi was not invited to the team by then-head coach Julio Velasco, Marouf became the team captain ever since. Marouf In the 2013 Asian Men's Volleyball Championship was selected as the Most valuable player. He was introduced as the Best setter in at 2014 FIVB World League above Bruno Rezende and Dragan Travica.

Clubs in Iran
He started his career in his hometown volleyball club Urmia Moqavemat he has also played for Sanam Tehran, Shahrdari Urmia, Matin Varamin, Esteghlal Gonbad, Saipa Tehran, Damash Gilan, Kalleh Mazandaran. Marouf's first championship experience in Iranian Volleyball Super League was with Sanam Tehran and in 2011-2012 season he plays for Kalleh Mazandaran and he celebrates the Iranian Volleyball Super League championship with his team for the second time. He in 2014 Asian Men's Club Volleyball Championship tournament won the championship with Matin Varamin. in 2014 he signes a two-year contract with Shahrdari Urmia but halfway through the season he terminates the contract and subsequently joins the Zenit Kazan. Marouf in 2016 year join to Iran's most successful team Paykan Tehran.

Zenit Kazan
After years of speculation regarding his presence at a European club, on 27 December 2014 Marouf signed a one-year contract with Russian Super League champions Zenit Kazan with an option for a one-year extension. The contract was worth over 1 million dollars which made Marouf one of the world's highest-paid volleyball players in 2014 .

On 25 January 2015, Marouf made his debut in the Russian Super League for Zenit Kazan in a 3–0 straight-sets win over Dynamo Krasnodar.

Beijing BAIC Motor
Marouf after 2019 VNL transferred to Chinese Volleyball Super League for played in Beijing BAIC Motor.

Personal life
Marouf was born in Urmia, West Azerbaijan, Iran in a family with a history of involvement in volleyball including his uncles Jahangir Seyyed Abbasi, Nobakht Seyyed Abbasi, Khoshbakht Seyyed Abbasi, and his former teammate Vahid Seyyed Abbasi.

In school, he participated in other sports, including Cross country running, Basketball and Handball.

Social activity
Marouf, along with popular athletes such as Ali Daei, Hamid Sourian and Behdad Salimi, acted as a helper in the fight to eradicate poverty and hunger in the World Food Programme.

Honours

National team
World Grand Champions Cup
Bronze medal (1): 2017
Asian Championship
Gold medal (2): 2013, 2019
Silver medal (1): 2009
Asian Games
Gold medal (2): 2014, 2018
Silver medal (1): 2010
Asian Cup
Gold medal (2): 2008, 2010
Asian U20 Championship
Silver medal (1): 2004
U19 World Championship
Bronze medal (1): 2003
Asian U18 Championship
Silver medal (1): 2003

Club
European Champions League
Gold medal (1): 2015 (Zenit Kazan)
Asian Championship
Gold medal (3): 2008 , 2022 (Paykan Tehran), 2014 (Matin Varamin)
Russian Super League
Champions (1): 2015 (Zenit Kazan)
Iranian Super League
Champions (3): 2005 (Sanam Tehran), 2012 (Kalleh Mazandaran), 2014 (Matin Varamin)
Chinese Super League
Champions (1): 2021 (Beijing BAIC Motor)

Individual
Best Setter: 2008 3rd World Olympic Qualification Tournament
Most Popular Player: 2009 Asian Championship
Best Setter: 2010 Asian Cup
Best Setter: 2012 1st World Olympic Qualification Tournament
Best Setter: 2013 Asian Championship
Most Valuable Player: 2013 Asian Championship
Best Setter: 2014 World League
Iranian Sportsmen of the Year: 2014 (Media - ISNA)
Iranian Sportsmen of the Year: 2015 (IRIB)
Iran's Best Volleyball Player of the Year: 2014-15, 2016–17 (VLI)
Best Setter: 2016 1st World Olympic Qualification Tournament
Best Asian Athlete of the Year: 2016 (Le Monde)
Best Foreign Player: 2020–21 Chinese Super League

References

External links

FIVB biography
Zenit Kazan biography

1985 births
Living people
Iranian men's volleyball players
People from Urmia
Setters (volleyball)
Asian Games gold medalists for Iran
Asian Games silver medalists for Iran
Islamic Azad University, Central Tehran Branch alumni
Asian Games medalists in volleyball
Volleyball players at the 2010 Asian Games
Volleyball players at the 2014 Asian Games
Volleyball players at the 2018 Asian Games
Olympic volleyball players of Iran
Volleyball players at the 2016 Summer Olympics
Medalists at the 2010 Asian Games
Medalists at the 2014 Asian Games
Medalists at the 2018 Asian Games
Iranian expatriate sportspeople in Russia
Iranian expatriate sportspeople in Italy
Iranian expatriate sportspeople in China
Volleyball players at the 2020 Summer Olympics
VC Zenit Kazan players
Fenerbahçe volleyballers